Svetlana Ulyanova (born 29 August 1979) is a Russian weightlifter.

Career 
Ulyanova participated in the women's -48 kg class at the 2006 World Weightlifting Championships, but did not win a medal; however finished on an equal amount of lifted weight at the end of the competition alongside the silver and bronze medal winners. Yang Lian was outstanding lifting 29 kg more than the others. Wiratthaworn Aree (silver) and Hiromi Miyake (bronze) lifted 188 kg during the tournament. Ulyanova also lifted 188 kg, but as being the heaviest of the three (47.52 / 47.63 / 47.73 kg) did not receive a medal.

References 

Living people
1979 births
Russian female weightlifters
Place of birth missing (living people)
World Weightlifting Championships medalists
European Weightlifting Championships medalists
20th-century Russian women
21st-century Russian women